Ashok Gehlot (born 3 May 1951) is an Indian politician serving as the current Chief Minister of Rajasthan. He held this position from December 1998 to 2003, and from 2008 to 2013, and again from 17 December 2018. He represents Sardarpura constituency of Jodhpur as Member of Legislative Assembly of Rajasthan.

He was a national General secretary of Congress Party, in-charge of organisations and training from March 2018 to 23 January 2019. He was also made in-charge of Gujarat state during 2017 Gujarat Legislative Assembly election.

Personal life
Ashok Gehlot is the son of Laxman Singh Gehlot, a magician who used to travel around the country to show his magic tricks. He belongs to Mali caste.  Gehlot came from a humble family background with no connection in politics. He is a science and law graduate, he also holds an MA degree in economics. He is married to Sunita Gehlot and has a son and a daughter. His son Vaibhav Gehlot is a politician who contested in the Lok Sabha elections of 2019 from Jodhpur.

He is a member of the Indian National Congress (INC) party. He was influenced by the teachings of Mahatma Gandhi at a very young age and was actively engaged in social political work even as a student. During the East Bengali refugees crisis in 1971, he served in the refugee camps in the eastern states of India. It is there when former Prime Minister Indira Gandhi first identified his organizational skills during one of her visits to the refugee camps. Gehlot was later appointed the first State President of National Students' Union of India and successfully organised Congress's Student Wing in the state.  Gehlot is a staunch Gandhiite and he lived in Wardha to adapt his lifestyle as a Gandhiite. He eats before sunset and is a 
pure vegetarian and enjoys Satvik Meals. He is also a teetotaler.

Political career
 
He contested his first election for Rajasthan Legislative assembly in 1977 for Sardarpura constituency and lost by a margin of 4426 votes to his closest opponent Madhav Singh of the Janata Party. Gehlot had to sell his motorcycle to contest his first election.
In 1980 he contested Lok Sabha election from Jodhpur and won by a margin of 52,519 votes. In 1984 he was appointed as the Union Minister. In 1989 he lost the election from Jodhpur.

When the Congress party returned to power in 1991 he was appointed as Union Minister again by then Prime Minister P.V. Narasimha Rao. He was discharged from his duty in 1993 and headed towards his home state Rajasthan to manage Congress political affairs. In 1998, Congress won a landslide victory by winning 153 out of 200 seats. Ashok Gehlot was appointed as the Chief Minister of Rajasthan for the first time.

In 2003, Congress lost Rajasthan and won merely 56 seats. In 2008 Rajasthan Legislative Assembly election Congress was short of a majority by 4 seats and Gehlot who was a well-known troubleshooter in Congress was appointed as the Chief Minister to prevent instability and thus he was sworn in for the second time as Chief Minister.

In 2013, Congress suffered its worst-ever defeat by only winning 21 seats in 200 member assembly. Gehlot was then appointed as AICC General Secretary in 2013. He remained at the position till 2018 and after 2018 Rajasthan Legislative Assembly election, when Congress returned to power he was appointed as the Chief Minister for the third time despite the strong candidacy of Sachin Pilot due to his role in the revival of Congress after its worst-ever defeat in Legislative Elections. Sachin Pilot was appointed as Deputy Chief Minister.

In 2022, it was reported that Sonia Gandhi supports Gehlot leading Congress in the next Indian general election.

In 2023, during his budget speech of FY23-24, Ashok Gehlot mistakenly reads previous year budget for minutes until he was stopped by a INC MLA in the Rajasthan Legislative Assembly.

Positions held

Other positions held

References

External links
 
 Interview to rediff.com in 1999

|-

|-

|-

|-

1951 births
Living people
Chief Ministers of Rajasthan
Indian National Congress politicians
People from Jodhpur
Rajasthani people
Rajasthani politicians
India MPs 1980–1984
India MPs 1984–1989
India MPs 1991–1996
India MPs 1996–1997
India MPs 1998–1999
Finance Ministers of Rajasthan
Lok Sabha members from Rajasthan
Chief ministers from Indian National Congress
People named in the Paradise Papers
Rajasthan MLAs 2018–2023